The William P. Warnock House, at 501 S. 5th St. in Enterprise, Oregon, is a -story historic house was built in 1910 and has been the largest house in Enterprise.  It includes elements of Colonial Revival, Bungalow/craftsman, and Queen Anne architecture.

It was listed on the National Register of Historic Places in 1984.  It was deemed significant for its architecture and its good preservation, as well as for its association with W. P. Warnock, a pioneer of Wallowa County, who had the house built for his children to attend school in Enterprise.

References 

Houses on the National Register of Historic Places in Oregon
Queen Anne architecture in Oregon
Colonial Revival architecture in Oregon
Houses completed in 1910
Houses in Wallowa County, Oregon
National Register of Historic Places in Wallowa County, Oregon
Buildings and structures in Enterprise, Oregon